Sebastián Fernández Méndez  (1700, San Cristóbal de La Laguna - after 1774) was a Spanish sculptor of the 18th century from Tenerife. He is considered one of the island's most noted sculptors.

References

1700 births
18th-century Spanish sculptors
18th-century Spanish male artists
Spanish male sculptors
People from San Cristóbal de La Laguna
18th-century deaths
Artists from the Canary Islands